2008 United States presidential candidates may refer to:

List of candidates in the United States presidential election, 2008
United States Democratic presidential candidates, 2008
United States Republican presidential candidates, 2008
United States third party presidential candidates, 2008